An Obvious Situation is a 1930 British crime film directed by Giuseppe Guarino and starring Sunday Wilshin, Walter Sondes and Carl Harbord. It was made as a quota quickie at Teddington Studios for release by Warner Brothers.

Cast
 Sunday Wilshin as Cella Stuart  
 Walter Sondes as John Stuart  
 Carl Harbord as Michael Turner  
 Marjorie Jennings as Betty Chase  
 Michael Hogan as Trimmett  
 Iris Ashley as Babe Carson  
 Mina Burnett as Manette  
 Harold Huth as Gustave

References

Bibliography
 Chibnall, Steve. Quota Quickies: The Birth of the British 'B' Film. British Film Institute, 2007.
 Low, Rachael. Filmmaking in 1930s Britain. George Allen & Unwin, 1985.
 Wood, Linda. British Films, 1927-1939. British Film Institute, 1986.

External links

1930 films
British crime films
British black-and-white films
1930 crime films
Films directed by Giuseppe Guarino
Films set in England
Films shot at Teddington Studios
Quota quickies
Warner Bros. films
1930s English-language films
1930s British films